Archery at the 1985 Southeast Asian Games was held at Football Field, Sport Authority of Thailand Sport Complex, Bangkok, Thailand.  The archery was held between December 12 to December 15.

Results (Individual)

References
BASOC (1985) 13th SEA Games Official Report, Thailand

Archery at the Southeast Asian Games
1985 Southeast Asian Games
International archery competitions hosted by Thailand
1985 in archery